Abdelrahman Raafat Zaky (born 8 September 2002), is a Qatari born-Egyptian professional footballer who plays as a midfielder for Qatar Stars League side Umm Salal.

Career
Abdelrahman started his career at the youth team of Umm Salal and represented the club at every level.

Career statistics

Club

Notes

References

External links
 

2002 births
Living people
Qatari footballers
Qatari people of Egyptian descent
Naturalised citizens of Qatar
Qatar youth international footballers
Association football midfielders
Umm Salal SC players
Qatar Stars League players